The fifth encirclement campaign against the Hubei–Henan–Anhui Soviet was an encirclement campaign launched by the Chinese Nationalist Government that was intended to destroy the communist Hubei–Henan–Anhui Soviet and its Chinese Red Army in the local region.  It was responded by the Communists' fifth counter-encirclement campaign at Hubei–Henan–Anhui Soviet, also called by the communists as the fifth counter-encirclement campaign at Hubei–Henan–Anhui Revolutionary Base, in which the local Nationalist force defeated the local Chinese Red Army and overran their soviet republic in the border region of Hubei, Henan, and Anhui provinces from 17 July 1933 to 26 November 1934.  In mid November 1934, the local communists were forced to abandon their base and begun their Long March, and hence the communists usually choose their beginning of the Long March as the end of the campaign, but in reality, the campaign was longer, lasting for another half a month till the end of November 1934 when the local Chinese Red Army fought its way to escape.

See also
List of battles of the Chinese Civil War
National Revolutionary Army
People's Liberation Army
History of the People's Liberation Army
Chinese Civil War

References
Military History Research Department, Complete History of the People's Liberation Army, Military Science Publishing House in Beijing, 2000, 

Campaigns of the Chinese Civil War
1933 in China
1934 in China